Eliza Day 'Lida' Voorhees (July 3, 1864 – February, 1934) was an American female tennis player who was active in the late 19th century.

Career
Voorhees reached the challenge round of the 1889 women's singles U.S. National Championships at the Philadelphia Cricket Club, the third championship held, in which she lost to defending champion Bertha Townsend in straight sets, 5–7, 2–6. She had won the right to challenge Townsend by winning the all-comers tournament, defeating Helen Day Harris in the final in three sets. In 1890, she again reached the final of the all-comers tournament, which she lost to Ellen Roosevelt. The latter defeated Townsend in the challenge round. In 1891, Voorhees made it to the semifinals of the all-comers tournament, where she was defeated by eventual champion Mabel Cahill from Ireland.

Personal life
Voorhees married Arthur Ferdinand Rodewald on April 27, 1892 in Trinity Church, Bergen Point. They had three sons (Frederick Arthur, b. March 3, 1893, Winthrop Voorhees, b. Dec. 22, 1894, Ferdinand Kingsley, b. Dec. 20, 1897). She was granted a decree of divorce, with custody of her children in New York on December 1, 1910.

Grand Slam finals

Singles (1 runner-up)

References

1864 births
1934 deaths
American female tennis players
Date of death missing
Sportspeople from Newark, New Jersey
Tennis people from New Jersey